Formula LO, previously known formally as LO Formel Lista Junior, was an open wheel racing series based in mainland Europe, which often ran as a support series to the Formula Renault 2.0 Switzerland. The first season was in 2000 and is based in Switzerland, and governed by the country's National Motorsport Authority. Because motorsports are essentially banned in Switzerland, the racing takes place on circuits in surrounding nations such as France, Italy and Germany. Many of the drivers go on to race in Formula Three and especially to the closely linked Formula BMW series. The series is often considered to be in competition with the German-based ADAC Formel Masters, which formed in 2008. It is named after its primary sponsor, Lista Office, owned by Swiss racing driver Fredy Lienhard.

Scoring system
 Points in the drivers' championship are awarded to the top ten race finishers with two bonus points for pole position and the fastest race lap. In the teams' championship, a team can only score points if one of its drivers finish in the top ten.

Drivers' championship

||

Teams' championship

Champions

See also
Formula BMW
Formula Junior
ADAC Formel Masters

External links
Formula Lista Junior official website
driverdb.com Formula Lista Junior
2009 Pre-season Information Pack

References

Formula Lista Junior
Formula Lista Junior
 
Motorsport in Switzerland
Recurring sporting events established in 2000
Recurring events disestablished in 2012